Poland–Saudi Arabia relations refers to the bilateral relations between Poland and Saudi Arabia.

History

Despite Poland and Saudi Arabia are both pro-West and they are allies of the United States and close tie with NATO, Poland has differed from Saudi Arabia, politically. Nonetheless, both two countries remain cordial relationship.

Poland has a small but indigenous Muslim population, the Lipka Tatars, which are often granted pilgrims by the Saudi Government when they travel to Mecca and Medina for the Hajj.

In February 2019, Poland hosted the February 2019 Warsaw Conference alongside the United States, which was attended by Saudi Arabia and was aimed at countering Saudi Arabia's regional rival, Iran.

In September 2019, Poland condemned the Abqaiq–Khurais attack on Saudi oil refineries.

Resident diplomatic missions
 Poland has an embassy in Riyadh.
 Saudi Arabia has an embassy in Warsaw.

See also
 Foreign relations of Poland 
 Foreign relations of Saudi Arabia

References

External links
Embassy of the Republic of Poland in Riyadh, Saudi Arabia
Embassy of the Kingdom of Saudi Arabia in Republic of Poland

 
Saudi Arabia
Poland